

Martin Milmore (1844–1883) was an American sculptor.

Life and career
Martin Milmore was born in Sligo, Ireland on September 14, 1844. He immigrated to Boston at age seven, graduated from Boston Latin School in 1860, took art lessons at the Lowell Institute, and learned to carve in wood and stone from his older brother Joseph (1841–1886).

He entered the studio of Thomas Ball of Charlestown in his early teens and stayed until the mid-1860s. His first sculptures seem to have been cabinet-size busts of Henry Wadsworth Longfellow (New Hampshire Historical Society, Concord) and Charles Sumner, both modeled from life around 1863. In the 1860s he worked from the Studio Building.

By his 20th birthday, Milmore received a commission for three giant figures ("Ceres", "Flora" and "Pomona") for the front of the Horticultural Hall in Boston; the restored versions are now on display at the Elm Bank Horticulture Center.

He subsequently designed the Roxbury Soldiers' Monument at Forest Hills Cemetery in Jamaica Plain, Massachusetts (1867), the American Sphinx in Mount Auburn Cemetery (1872), the Statue of John Glover on Commonwealth Avenue (1875), the Soldiers and Sailors Monument for the Boston Common (1877), and a bust of Senator Charles Sumner, now displayed in the United States Senate.

Milmore died in Boston on July 21, 1883. Daniel Chester French created a memorial tribute entitled Death and the Sculptor for the grave of Milmore and his brother in Forest Hills Cemetery.

Gallery

References
Notes

Bibliography

External links

 United States Senate
 Daniel Chester French: The Milmore Memorial
 Irish Heritage Trail

19th-century American sculptors
19th-century American male artists
American male sculptors
Cultural history of Boston
19th century in Boston
1844 births
1883 deaths
Roxbury Latin School alumni
People from Sligo (town)
Artists of the Boston Public Library